Chahar Bast Bagh (also Romanized as Chahār Bast Bāgh; also known as Chahār Bast) is a village in Balaband Rural District, in the Central District of Fariman County, Razavi Khorasan Province, Iran. At the 2006 census, its population was 778, in 157 families.

References 

Populated places in Fariman County